The term "Maximum Leader" (Spanish: Líder Máximo) has been used by, or to describe, a number of politicians, including:
 Fidel Castro, the title is not utilised in Cuba
 Massimo D'Alema, an Italian politician who served as Prime Minister (1998–2000), and Deputy Prime Minister and Minister of Foreign Affairs (2006–2008)
 Manuel Noriega, an official title given to him in 1989 by Panama's National Assembly
 Omar Torrijos, was recognised as "Maximum Leader of the Panamanian Revolution" in the 1972 Constitution of Panama